Gare de Clichy–Levallois is a railway station serving the towns Clichy and Levallois-Perret, Hauts-de-Seine department, in the northwestern suburbs of Paris, France. It is on the Paris–Le Havre railway.

References

External links

 

Railway stations in Hauts-de-Seine
Railway stations in France opened in 1838